Patrick G. Kennedy SJ (1881–1966), was an Irish Jesuit priest, naturalist and ornithologist. He was responsible for creating Ireland's first nature reserve at Bull Island in Dublin in 1931. He served as president of the Dublin Naturalist and Field Club (1941–42).

Kennedy was born in Caherconlish, County Limerick in 1881. He was educated at Crescent College and joined the Jesuits in 1898, training in Tullabeg College, Stonyhurst College in England and Milltown Park in Dublin. He taught for a number of years in the Crescent College, Limerick where he was prefect of studies from 1916 to 1925 and Belvedere College, Dublin.

Publications
 An Irish Sanctuary – Birds of the North Bull, by Fr. Patrick G. Kennedy SJ, Dublin: The Sign of The Three Candles, 1953.
 The birds of Ireland, by P. G. Kennedy SJ, and Kevin O'Shiel, 1955.

References

Irish ornithologists
20th-century Irish Jesuits
1881 births
1966 deaths
People educated at Crescent College
People educated at Stonyhurst College
Alumni of Milltown Institute of Theology and Philosophy
Clergy from County Limerick
Faculty of Belvedere College
20th-century Irish zoologists
Scientists from County Limerick